California bikeway classifications are standards for identifying the level of travel efficiency and human protection offered by the various bike routes in the state. Traffic engineers use the designations for route planning.

See also 
 List of cycleways
 Bicycle law in California
 United States Bicycle Route System

References

External links 
 Bikeway Classification brochure

Bike paths in California